Conception dreams are dreams that are said to foretell the conception or birth of a child, dreamt by the future mother or people close to her. The belief that a dream will foretell a baby's birth originates from Ancient India and is found in some Asian countries.

In India
Ancient India believes that conception dream predicts the child character. Maya (mother of the Buddha) dreamt that a white elephant with six white tusks entered her right side.

In Jainism dreams are connected with the births of Tirthankaras and the other prominent people including chakravarti, Balabhadras and Vāsudevas. They are 63 in total and called Shalakapurusha. Their mothers see a certain number of dreams on conception of their soul in womb. They are described in the great detail in Kalpasutra. 12th century Jain monk Hemchandracharya described and interpreted them in detail in Trishashthishalakapurush. Avashyak-niryukti, an early verse-commentary in Prakrit, explains relation of names of some Tirthankaras and these dreams.

Rathore ruler Simhaji's queen dreamt 3 lions before birth of his 3 son. Ramakrishna parents experienced supernatural incidents and visions before his birth. In Gaya his father Khudiram had a dream in which Lord Gadadhara (a form of Vishnu), said that he would be born as his son. Chandramani Devi is said to have had a vision of light entering her womb from Shiva's temple. Nahusha mother Indumati had conception dream. According to Dashakumaracharita Queen vasumati conceiving her first son hamsavahana, dreams that she has bathed in the water of all pilgrimages. While conceiving her second son Rajavahana she dreams that she swallowed the orb of universe.

In Korea

In Korea conception dreams are known as 태몽(taemong). Many women in Korean culture report having such dreams themselves. Popular topics of the dreams include fruit (such as apples, persimmons, cherries, chestnuts), animals (tigers, snakes, goldfish), nature (rivers, rainbows), children and jewels. The dreamer might eat or take fruits, embrace animals, or interact with nature. The topic is believed to influence the gender or the future of the baby; for example, fruits are seen as a sign for a baby girl.

The person having the dream can be the mother herself, but close family members such as her mother or the husband can also have conception dreams instead of the mother.

Dreams are often considered to be omens, and sometimes people will "buy" dreams from friends, if they feel it is a good omen or a good conception dream.

Accounts of conception dreams can be found in numerous old histories. One example is the conception dream of Kim Yushin, from the 6th century CE, documented in the Samguk Sagi.

See also
Trishala
Maya (mother of the Buddha)
Auspicious dreams in Jainism
Taegyo
Pregnancy
Prenatal development
Korean mythology

References

Works cited
 
 

Korean culture
Indian culture
Folklore
Human pregnancy